Mohamed M. Abou El Enein (born September 5, 1951) is an Egyptian businessman, investor, public figure and politician. He is the chairman and founder of Cleopatra Group and the founder of many major projects spread all over Egypt. He has been a Member of Parliament for over 15 years, from 1995 to 2011, being chosen as the Chairman of many Committees and as a representative in many international assemblies. He won several international awards and certificates of honor for his contribution to the various fields of business.

Abou El Enein founded Cleopatra Group in 1983. At the time, he started with the ceramics industry, with one factory. Within a very short period of time, this business expanded to encompass 60% of the local market share, in addition to opening up business in new international markets. Based on this leap forward, Abou El Enein's business ventures were diversified to include the areas of agriculture, mining, real estate, tourism, media, high-tech projects and aviation (Abou El Enein is also a certified pilot).

Cleopatra branding and licensing 
Beyond his traditional ventures in the ceramics industry, and having carved out a niche for the Cleopatra brand within his industries, Abou El Enein has since then moved on to establish the Cleopatra name and brand in a multitude of other industries and products. Abou El Enein has succeeded in marketing the Cleopatra brand in the hospitality business with Cleo Travel (a travel agency), Cleopatra Silicon Valley (smart card manufacturing), Cleopatra Luxury Hotels & Resorts (a number of luxury resorts in Sharm el-Sheikh, Hurgada, Taba, Mersa Matruh), Cleopatra Media for TV Channels (encompassing 3 TV channels and a news website), among other projects and brands. In addition, he is the chairman of Ceramica Cleopatra FC.

Business Profile

Business Ventures and Investments 
Mohamed Abou El Enein began his entrepreneurial career in international trade between Europe and Egypt back in 1973.  In 1983, he established his first factory in the 10th of Ramadan City, which was the first of its kind in Egypt to manufacture quality ceramics. Currently the brand name Ceramica Cleopatra has become one of the world's largest producers of ceramics, porcelain and sanitary ware, with 17 factories, under the umbrella of Cleopatra Group.

Other Business Ventures

Agricultural development 
Mohamed Abou El Enein is a pioneer in desert reclamation. His projects in East al-Owinat area, Al Nobaria, 10th of Ramadan, East of Suez, Sahl Al Tina and Wadi Al Mullak, helped to transform the deserted and remote regions into a habitat where farms were established and entire communities thrived, over a total of 13,750 acres.

Tourism 
He founded a number of luxury resorts and hotels in Sharm el-Sheikh, Makadi Bay, Marsa Alam, and Taba; employing hundreds of Egyptians, in addition to new projects under construction in Mersa Matruh, with a modern vision for integrated tourism development. Recently, Cleopatra acquired the second largest German tourism company, Aldiana, with ten Club Hotels spread in 6 different countries (Tunisia, Spain, Austria, Turkey, Cyprus and Greece).

Real estate development 
Real Estate development also had its share in Abou El Enein's investments with 5 different projects:
 Cleopatra Square in 6th of October City (consisting of 117 plots allocated for high class residential villas )
 Cleopatra Palace in Shorouk City (a first-class compound located over 200 000 m2 and including tow-story villas & 16 residential buildings)
 Cleopatra Plaza in Nasr City (a residential and commercial Complex)
 Azarita Plaza in Alexandria (a residential and commercial complex stretching over 5000 m2 )
 Cleopatra Shopping Mall (due to be inaugurated in the first quarter of 2017)

Media 
Cleopatra Media for TV Channels is a leading Egyptian media network that consists not only of three TV channels ranked among the most-viewed in Egypt and in the Arab World (among the top 10), but also an online website that is among the top five in the country, covering a wide array of public interests, from politics to economics, from entertainment to sports.

Aviation 
Cleopatra Aviation has three main operations.  The first part is the Flight Department and Charter Operation.  The second branch is the Aircraft Maintenance Facility. And the final branch centers on providing transit Business jets with handling, servicing and passengers’ services in Cairo.  Cleopatra Aviation is currently in the final phase of obtaining their Egyptian Air Operating Charter in the very near future.

Cleopatra Silicon Valley 
CSV is a high-tech industrial complex. Abou El Enein established the Smart Card factory, the first and largest factory of its kind in Egypt. It produces all kinds of smart cards, starting from scratch cards, memory cards, SIM cards to credit cards.

Political Activity 
 Abou El Enein was a member of the People's Assembly since 1995. In 2005, he was elected “Chairman of the Committee on Housing, Public Utilities and Construction” (2000 - 2005), then the “Chairman of the Committee on Industry and Energy” (2005-2011).
 On the international level, Abou El Enein was elected in 2010 as the Chairman of the Parliamentary Assembly of the Mediterranean (PAM), based in Malta, which encompasses 37 member countries north and south of the Mediterranean.
 He was also elected as the Chairman of the Committee on Economic and Financial Affairs, Social Affairs and Education of the Parliamentary Assembly of the Union for the Mediterranean (PA-UfM) for two consecutive terms.
 The Euro-Med Parliament honored him and awarded him, as the representative of all Parliamentary Members of the southern Mediterranean countries, the “Parliamentary Excellence Award” in recognition for his support of the international and regional parliamentary effort.
 The Parliamentary Assembly of the Mediterranean (PAM) selected him to be its “Roving Ambassador”, as well as its “Permanent Representative to the League of Arab States”
 He was award the International Social Commitment Award in 2018.

Honorary Positions 
 July 2012: International Business and Economic Consultant by the UN World Organization for Trade in Services for his industrial, commercial, agricultural and tourism experience and contributions for over 40 years.
 January & February 2012: Accredited International and Industrial Arbitrator by the International Council of Arbitration, making him eligible to settle industrial disputes and solving commercial and industrial problems and obstacles among bodies, companies and factories.
 Advisor to International Arbitration for the Industrial and Commercial Sector by Natural and Human Resources Development Center - Institute of African Studies - Cairo University.

Civic Society Activities 
Abou El Enein has a distinct and widely recognized contribution to social work.
 He was elected President of the Egyptian-European Council since 2007. The council is one of civil society institutions, which plays an important role in strengthening economic cooperation and mutual cultural and political relations between Egypt and Europe.
 Corporate social responsibility features high on the agenda of Abou El Enein. In 2001, he established the “Abou El Enein Organization for Social Activities & Charity”. This Organization offers literacy classes, undertakes schools development, and aims at contributing to human development.

Personal 
Mohamed M. Abou El Enein had married an Italian woman for ten years before her death. Then he became married again, with whom he has three sons and a daughter. He is a sports fan who has been playing tennis for years. His preferred family vacation is spent in skiing resorts, which is yet another favored sport.

References

External links
 Official site of Mohamed M. Abou El Enein
 Official YouTube Channel of Mohamed M. Abou El Enein

1951 births
Living people
Businesspeople from Cairo
Politicians from Cairo
Members of the House of Representatives (Egypt)
Egyptian investors
Egyptian businesspeople
Egyptian business executives
Egyptian chief executives
Helwan University alumni
20th-century Egyptian businesspeople
21st-century Egyptian businesspeople
20th-century Egyptian politicians
21st-century Egyptian politicians